Pitambarhat Bazali is a village in Kamrup, situated in south bank of Brahmaputra river.

Transport
Pubborka is accessible through National Highway 37. All major private commercial vehicles ply between Pitambarhat Bazali and nearby towns.

See also
 Guakuchi
 Ramdia

References

Villages in Kamrup district